An annular solar eclipse occurred on August 10, 1934, with an eclipse magnitude of 0.9436. A solar eclipse occurs when the Moon passes between Earth and the Sun, thereby totally or partly obscuring the image of the Sun for a viewer on Earth. An annular solar eclipse occurs when the Moon's apparent diameter is smaller than the Sun's, blocking most of the Sun's light and causing the Sun to look like an annulus (ring). An annular eclipse appears as a partial eclipse over a region of the Earth thousands of kilometres wide.

Related eclipses

Solar eclipses 1931–1935

Inex series 

In the 19th century:
 Solar saros 140: total solar eclipse of October 29, 1818
 Solar saros 141: annular solar eclipse of October 9, 1847
 Solar saros 142: total solar eclipse of September 17, 1876

In the 22nd century:
 Solar saros 150: partial solar eclipse of April 11, 2108
 Solar saros 151: annular solar eclipse of March 21, 2137
 Solar saros 152: total solar eclipse of March 2, 2166
 Solar saros 153: annular solar eclipse of February 10, 2195

Saros 144 

It is a part of Saros cycle 144, repeating every 18 years, 11 days, containing 70 events. The series started with partial solar eclipse on April 11, 1736. It contains annular eclipses from July 7, 1880, through August 27, 2565. There are no total eclipses in the series. The series ends at member 70 as a partial eclipse on May 5, 2980. The longest duration of annularity will be 9 minutes, 52 seconds on December 29, 2168.
<noinclude>

Notes

References

1934 8 10
1934 in science
1934 August 10
August 1934 events